Bartolomeo Gandolfi (died 1471) was an Italian Roman Catholic prelate who served as Bishop of Faenza (1463–1471).

Biography

Already by 1437, Bartolomeo di Francisci Gandolfi was a Canon of the Cathedral Chapter and iudex capituli. By June 1463, he is recorded as Archpriest of the plebs of Corleto.

Bishop Alessandro Stampetti da Sarnano of Faenza died in February 1463. The Cathedral Chapter duly met and, on 20 February, elected Federico Manfredi, a Canon of the Cathedral and the son of Astorgio II, Lord of Faenza. Pope Pius II, however, refused to ratify the election of a young man who was only twenty-two years old, and quashed the election. On 10 April 1463, Bartolomeo Gandolfi was appointed by Pope Pius II as Bishop of Faenza, at the suggestion of Astorgio II.

On 27 November 1463, he was consecrated bishop by Giacomo Paladini, Bishop of Forlì.

He died in 1470, between 19 July and 21 December. His successor, Federico Manfredi, was still only a Protonotary Apostolic in a document of 19 July 1470, but already Bishop of Faenza, according to a document dated 21 December 1470.

References

Sources

 [highly inaccurate]

15th-century Italian Roman Catholic bishops
Bishops appointed by Pope Pius II
1471 deaths